FC Rassvet Troitskoye was a Russian football team from Troitskoye, Voronezh Oblast. It played professionally for one season in 1997, taking 2nd place in Zone Center of the Russian Third League.

External links
  Team history at KLISF

Association football clubs established in 1996
Association football clubs disestablished in 1998
Defunct football clubs in Russia
Sport in Voronezh Oblast
1996 establishments in Russia
1998 disestablishments in Russia